Tachygerris is a genus of Water Strider.

Species
 Tachygerris adamsoni (Drake, 1942)
 Tachygerris celocis (Drake & Harris, 1931)
 Tachygerris dentiferus Padilla-Gil & Nieser, 2010
 Tachygerris opacus (Champion, 1901)
 Tachygerris tucanensis Morales-C. & Castro-Vargas, 2013
Tachygerris tumaquensis Padilla-Gil, 2010

References

Gerrinae
Gerromorpha genera